The discography of American R&B singer Olivia Longott, who performs under the mononym Olivia, consists of one studio album, one unreleased album, fifteen singles, four of which she performs as the featured artist, and five music videos.

Albums

Studio albums

Singles

As lead artist

As featured artist

Guest appearances

Music videos

As lead artist

As featured artist
2004: "Smile"
2005: "Candy Shop"
2005: "Wild 2Nite"
2006: "Best Friend (Remix)"
2009: "Chaise Electrique"

Notes

References

External links
 Official website
 Olivia at AllMusic
 
 

Discographies of American artists
Hip hop discographies
Contemporary R&B discographies